Ockham Park is a seventeenth-century English country house in Ockham, Surrey.

The house is a square two-storey block in red brick with 7 bays on each side with a hipped tiled roof. The nearby two-storey stable block is grade II* listed and is now converted into flats.

History
Built 1638 for the Weston family as their new manor house, it was altered in 1727–9 to designs by Nicholas Hawksmoor for Lord King, the Lord Chancellor, created 1st Baron King in 1725.  The family descends from a grocer of Exeter and his wife, the great-niece of philosopher John Locke.

In the 1830s it was extended in Italianate style for the seventh Lord King. His son  William was elevated to an earldom as 'the Earl of Lovelace' and lived here with his wife Ada Lovelace. The house remained in the hands of the family until it was gutted by fire in 1948.

The fire left the orangery, stable block, kitchen wing, and a solitary Italianate tower. The surviving buildings, in part, were restored in the 1970s.

Depictions

A steel intaglio engraving "Ockham Park, seat of the Right Hon. the Earl of Lovelace"  by T. A. Prior after a painting by T. Allom, was used in print for in E.W. Brayley's A Topographical History of Surrey (1850).

References

Country houses in Surrey
Grade II listed buildings in Surrey
Grade II* listed buildings in Surrey
Grade II listed houses
Nicholas Hawksmoor buildings
Italianate architecture in England